Attila Zubor (born March 12, 1975) is a former freestyle swimmer from Hungary, who competed in three consecutive Summer Olympics for his native country, starting in 1996. He was trained by the Tamás Széchy, who coached Tamás Darnyi among others.

Awards
 Hungarian swimmer of the Year (1): 2001

References

1975 births
Living people
Hungarian male swimmers
Olympic swimmers of Hungary
Hungarian male freestyle swimmers
Swimmers at the 1996 Summer Olympics
Swimmers at the 2000 Summer Olympics
Swimmers at the 2004 Summer Olympics
Swimmers from Budapest
World Aquatics Championships medalists in swimming
European Aquatics Championships medalists in swimming